Vattekunnam is a small village in Kalamassery Municipality, Kerala, India. A railway tunnel connects the village with National Highway 47 at Edappally Toll.

References 

Villages in Ernakulam district